The Karen Fraser Woodland Trail is a  paved rail trail in Thurston County, Washington that connects the cities of Olympia and Lacey along the abandoned Burlington Northern corridor. The trail opened in 2007 and connects with the Chehalis Western Trail at the border between the two cities. The Olympia trailhead features a sustainably designed shelter and restroom with a living roof and a rain garden and parts of the trail run alongside Indian Creek.

Route
At the beginning trailhead at Watershed Park, the Karen Fraser Woodland Trail meanders west, briefly following Interstate 5 and Indian Creek before crossing through the Olympia border into the city of Lacey. The trail crosses the Chehalis Western Trail, at a roundabout connection named Hub Junction, and continues on a westerly path past the Lacey Depot, a picnic and trained-themed playground area. The trail terminates past Woodland Creek Community Park near Long Lake.

Future plans
Future phases will extend the trail west through Watershed Park, crossing the Deschutes River, and ending at Tumwater Falls. The future Deschutes Valley Trail will start at Tumwater Falls and continue the trail to Pioneer Park.

History

In 1990, Olympia residents Jim and Carol Rainwood suggested the creation of the trail and formed the Woodland Trail Greenway Association who contributed time and resources to trail development. Their work resulted in the creation of the Olympia Woodland Trail and the Lacey Woodland Trail.

The city of Lacey began to obtain rail lines from Burlington Northern and Georgia-Pacific between 2002 and 2005. In October 2017, the two trails were renamed with a single name to honor State Senator Karen Fraser who previously represented the area and was, in 1976, the first female mayor of Lacey.

A pair of ten-foot cedar wood carvings, created by an artist of the Squaxin Island Tribe, were installed at the Watershed trailhead in 2021 after an arts initiative begun by the city of Olympia. A commemoration marker to honor a local couple for their civil rights work was installed on the trail at Goose Pond in 2022.

External links 
 Karen Fraser Woodland Trail (Olympia Section)
 Karen Fraser Woodland Trail (Lacey Section)

References 

Protected areas of Thurston County, Washington
Rail trails in Washington (state)